Lipsko  (Lyps'ko) is a village in the administrative district of Gmina Narol, within Lubaczów County, Subcarpathian Voivodeship, in south-eastern Poland.

The village has a population of 365.

References

Lipsko